Tibro AIK FK is a Swedish football club located in Tibro in Tibro Municipality, Västra Götaland County.

Background
Since their foundation Tibro AIK FK has participated mainly in the middle and lower divisions of the Swedish football league system. The club currently (2013) plays in Division 2 Norra Götaland which is the fourth tier of Swedish football. They play their home matches at the Sportparken Tibro in Tibro.

Tibro AIK FK are affiliated to the Västergötlands Fotbollförbund.

Season to season

Attendances

In recent seasons Tibro AIK FK have had the following average attendances:

Footnotes

External links
 Tibro AIK FK – Official website

Football clubs in Västra Götaland County